This is a list of episodes for the anime series Powerpuff Girls Z. It ran for 52 episodes on TV Tokyo from July 1, 2006, to June 30, 2007. The English adaptation of the show has begun airing in English-speaking markets but has not made it to U.S. shores. All 52 episodes have been dubbed in English.
 Note: In the original Japanese version, the girls are known as Momoko (Blossom), Miyako (Bubbles), and Kaoru (Buttercup) when not in their superheroine forms. Per WP:MOS-AM, their English names will be used in the titles and short summaries. All other names are subject to change once officially released.
 English translations of Japanese titles are taken from the Collector's Edition DVDs.

Episode list

See also 
 Lists of Powerpuff Girls episodes

References

Sources

External links 
 IMDb

Lists of anime episodes
episodes
Lists of Cartoon Network television series episodes
2000s television-related lists